Norse mythology includes a diverse array of people, places, creatures, and other mythical elements.

Places
Álfheim
Asgard
Bifröst
Bilskirnir
Breidablik
Elivagar
Fyris Wolds
Gandvik
Ginnungagap 
Hel
Hlidskjalf
Hvergelmir
Jötunheimr
Leipter River
Kormet
Midgard
Muspelheim
Náströnd
Niðavellir
Niflheim 
Ormet
Reidgotaland
Sessrúmnir
Slidr River
Svartálfaheim
Útgarðar
Valhalla
Vanaheim
Vimur
Yggdrasil

Events
Æsir–Vanir War
Battle of Brávellir
Battle on the Ice of Lake Vänern
Ēostre
Fimbulwinter
Hjaðningavíg
Mōdraniht
Ragnarök
Rheda (mythology)
Yule

Artifacts
Balmung
Brisingamen
Draupnir
Dromi
Eitr
Gjallarhorn
Gleipnir
Gram
Gullinbursti
Gungnir
Hringhorni
Læðingur
Mjölnir
Naglfar
Skíðblaðnir
Svalinn
Tyrfing
Well of Urd

People
Adils
Alaric and Eric
Arngrim
Ask and Embla
Aun
Berserkers
Bödvar Bjarki
Dag the Wise
Domalde
Domar
Dyggve
Egil One-Hand
Fafnir
Fjölnir
Gudrun
Harald Hildetand
Ingjald
Ivar Vidfamne
Lif and Lifthrasir
Nór
Ohthere
Ragnar Lodbrok
Rerir
Raum the Old
Shieldmaiden
Sigi 
Sigmund
Signy
Sigurd
Sigurd Hring
Skirnir
Skjöld
Starkad
Sveigðir
Volsung
Yngvi and Alf

Dwarfs

Many dwarfs are named in the poem Völuspá and repeated in Gylfaginning
Alvíss
Andvari
Billingr
Brokkr
Dainn
Durinn
Dúrnir
Dvalinn
Eitri
Fafnir
Fjalar and Galar
Gandalf
Hreiðmarr
Litr
Mótsognir
Norðri, Suðri, Austri and Vestri
Ótr
Regin
Sindari
Sons of Ivaldi

Other assorted beings
Alberich
Álfar
Auðumbla
Dökkálfar
Draugr
Fenrisulfr
Garmr
Geri and Freki
Gullinbursti
Gultopp
Hati
Hugin and Munin
Jörmungandr
Kraken
Ljósálfar
Marmennill
Móinn
Níðhöggr
The Norns
Ratatoskr
Skoll
Sleipnir
Surtr
Svadilfari
Svartálfar
Tanngrisnir and Tanngnjóstr
Valkyrie

See also
List of Norse gods
List of jötnar in Norse mythology
The Nine Worlds of Norse mythology
Numbers in Norse mythology
Norse mythological influences on later literature
Rök runestone

References

Norse mythology
Norse mythology